Pink Floyd: The Music and the Mystery is a 2010 non-fiction book by Andy Mabbett about the English rock band Pink Floyd. The book includes a complete discography of all the band's songs and albums as well as a timeline of events and other information. The book was edited by Chris Charlesworth and published as a paperback by Omnibus Press on 1 September 2010. The book is also available as an eBook from Omnibus Press.

References

External links

2010 non-fiction books
Pink Floyd
Books by Andy Mabbett